The 1878 Marlborough by-election was fought on 31 January 1878.  The byelection was fought due to the succession to a peerage of the incumbent Liberal MP, Lord Ernest Brudenell-Bruce.  It was won by the unopposed Liberal candidate Lord Charles Brudenell-Bruce.

References

1878 in England
Marlborough, Wiltshire
1878 elections in the United Kingdom
By-elections to the Parliament of the United Kingdom in Wiltshire constituencies
19th century in Wiltshire
Unopposed by-elections to the Parliament of the United Kingdom in English constituencies